Simon Richard Hansford (born 3 June 1963) is a Christian minister and Moderator of the Uniting Church in Australia, Synod of New South Wales and the ACT.

Birth and family
Hansford was born in Sydney, the son of Barbara (née Grove) and Richard Hansford. His maternal grandfather was Rupert Grove (1906–1982), of whom the Australian Dictionary of Biography states: "in the progression towards the union of the Congregational, Methodist and Presbyterian churches in Australia, Grove made a decisive impact." Rupert Grove and his son-in-law, Richard Hansford, were partners in the Sydney legal firm McCoy, Grove & Atkinson.

Education
Hansford attended Newington College (1970–1980) commencing in the Preparatory School at Lindfield. He studied for the ministry at the United Theological College (1988-1990) at North Parramatta, which is now a part of Charles Sturt University.

Clerical life
His first ministry placement was in Dubbo, New South Wales, in 1991. After 12 years in Dubbo he spent three years in Queanbeyan. He then served as Presbytery Minister in north-western NSW for seven years before his 2012 appointment as the Minister of Southside Uniting Church in Tamworth.

Marriage and children
Hansford is married to  Fiona and they have two daughters, Rachel and Miriam.

References

1963 births
Living people
People educated at Newington College
Uniting Church in Australia ministers